The Jewel Bain House Number 4 is a historic house at 27 Longmeadow in Pine Bluff, Arkansas.  It is a U-shaped single-story brick structure, with sections covered by separately hipped roofs that have extended eaves with exposed rafter tails.  The roof is covered with distinctive tiles imported from Japan.  Some windows are covered by wooden Japanese screens.  The house was built about 1965, designed by architect Jewel Bain, one of the few female architects working in Arkansas at the time.

The house was listed on the National Register of Historic Places in 2017.

See also
National Register of Historic Places listings in Jefferson County, Arkansas

References

Houses completed in 1965
Houses in Pine Bluff, Arkansas
Houses on the National Register of Historic Places in Arkansas
National Register of Historic Places in Pine Bluff, Arkansas